This is a list of rail accidents in China.

19th century

20th century

21st century

See also 
 List of rail accidents by country

References 

Accidents
China
Railway accidents and incidents in China
rail accidents